The Second Battle of Dego was fought on 14  and 15 April 1796 during the French Revolutionary Wars between French forces and Austro-Sardinian forces. The battle was fought near Dego, a hamlet in northwestern Italy, and ended in a French victory.

Background

After successfully defeating the Austrian right wing at the Battle of Montenotte, Napoleon Bonaparte continued with his plan to separate the Austrian army of General Johann Beaulieu from the army of the Kingdom of Piedmont-Sardinia led by General Michelangelo Colli. By taking the defences at Dego, the French would control the only road by which the two armies could link with each other. The town's defences comprised both a castle on a bluff and earthworks on rising ground, and were held by a small mixed force, consisting of units of both the Austrian and Piedmont-Sardinian armies.

Forces
Army of Italy: Napoleon Bonaparte (15,000)
 Attached to army command:
 Cavalry Division: Henri Stengel
 Regiments: 5th Dragoons, 22nd Horse Chasseurs
 Corps: André Masséna
 Division: Amédée Laharpe
 Brigadiers: Jean Pijon, Jean Ménard, Jean Cervoni
 Demi-brigades: 1st Light, 14th, 21st, 69th, 70th and 99th Line
 Division: Jean Meynier
 Brigadiers: Elzéard Dommartin, Barthélemy Joubert (not present)
 Demi-brigades: 45th, 46th, 84th and 100th Line
Austrian Forces
 Part of Right Wing: Eugène Argenteau (5,700)
 Austrian Regiments, 1 bn each: Stain IR # 50, Pellegrini IR # 49, Schröder IR # 26, Alvinczi # 19, Terzi IR # 16, Nádasdy IR # 39, Deutschmeister IR # 4
 Austrian Regiments: Preiss IR # 24 (3 bns), Archduke Anton IR # 52 (2 bns)
 Sardinian Regiments: La Marina IR (2 bns), Montferrat IR (1 bn)
 Brigade: Josef Vukassovich (3,500)
 Regiments: Carlstadt Grenz IR (2 bns), Alvinczi IR # 19, Nádasdy IR # 39, Preiss IR # 24 (all 1 bn)

Key
 Line = Line Infantry
 Light = Light Infantry
 IR = Infantry Regiment
 bn = infantry battalion

Battle

On 14 April, André Masséna, leading Amédée Laharpe's division and one brigade of Jean-Baptiste Meynier's division attacked the town. The French overran the defences, losing about 1,500 killed and wounded. The Austrians suffered 3,000 casualties, including a large number of prisoners. Argenteau's survivors fled northeast to the town of Acqui Terme. Bonaparte ordered Meynier to hold Dego, while he took Laharpe's division west to fight Colli's Sardinians.

However, the French troops in Dego then gave themselves over to looting, and during the night they were mostly scattered in the nearby houses. At dawn on 15 April, under cover of fog, the defences were counter-attacked by an Austrian force under Colonel Josef Vukassovich. Beaulieu planned for Vukassovich to reinforce Argenteau the day before, but his orders were poorly written and his subordinate showed up at Dego a day too late. Nevertheless, taken by surprise, the French were rapidly driven out of Dego and back to their starting point of the day before. Allegedly, the surprise attack caught Masséna in bed with a woman and he escaped in his nightshirt.

Masséna took some time to take control of the situation again. He recalled Laharpe and organised a counter-attack, which was supported by other reinforcements brought up by Bonaparte. Vukassovich's force was heavily outnumbered, and was unable to defend for long before it was driven out, leaving Dego definitively in French hands.

Results

The second day's action cost the Austrians a further 670 killed and wounded, plus 1,087 captured. The Preiss Infantry Regiment # 24 took particularly heavy losses. The French lost 621 killed and wounded, and 317 captured. The second day surprise made Bonaparte anxious that Beaulieu might intervene from the east, so the French general reorganized his forces and sent out strong patrols on 16 April. But Argenteau's mauling at Montenotte and Dego shook Beaulieu's nerve and he stayed near Acqui. Satisfied that Beaulieu was out of the picture, Bonaparte turned on Colli with his main strength on 17 April. On 21 April, The French beat Colli at the Battle of Mondovì and soon afterward the Sardinian government sued for peace.

Footnotes

References
Boycott-Brown, M. The Road to Rivoli, London, Cassell, 2001
Chandler, David. The Campaigns of Napoleon. New York: Macmillan, 1966.
Chandler, David Dictionary of the Napoleonic Wars. Wordsworth editions, 1999.
Fiebeger, G. J. The Campaigns of Napoleon Bonaparte of 1796-1797. West Point, NY: US Military Academy Printing Office, 1911. Reprinted in Bonaparte in Italy Operational Studies Group wargame study folder.
Schels, J. B. 'Die Gefechte in den Apenninen, bei Voltri, Montenotte, Millessimo, Cossaria und Dego, im April 1796.' Oesterreichische Militärische Zeitschrift, Bd. 2 (1822): 123-217
Smith, Digby. The Napoleonic Wars Data Book. London: Greenhill, 1998.

External links
Bonaparte's blitzkrieg in Italy 1796, Dego and Lodi

Battles involving Austria
Battles involving Italy
Battles involving the Kingdom of Sardinia
Second Battle of Dego
Second Battle of Dego
Battles of the War of the First Coalition
Battles in Liguria
18th-century military history of Italy
Battles inscribed on the Arc de Triomphe